Seven ships of the Royal Navy have been named HMS Hecla, after the volcano Hekla in Iceland.

  was a 10-gun bomb vessel purchased in 1797. She participated in the Battle of Copenhagen (1801) and was broken up in 1813
 , launched in 1815, was a  bomb vessel; she was later converted to an exploration ship and was commanded by William Edward Parry during his exploration of the Arctic
  was a 4-gun  wooden paddle sloop launched in 1839, run aground off Gibraltar on 23 January 1855 and sold in 1863
  was a torpedo boat carrier/depot ship purchased in 1878, modernised in 1912 and sold in 1926
  was a destroyer depot ship launched in March 1940 and sunk off Casablanca on 12 November 1942 by the 
 HMS Hecla was a repair ship launched in 1944 and transferred to the United States Navy as 
 , launched in 1964, was a  sold in 1997

References

Royal Navy ship names